The Football Sri Lanka (FSL) is the governing body of football in Sri Lanka. It
operates the Sri Lanka national football team and Sri Lanka Football Premier League.

History 
Football Sri Lanka was founded on 1939 as Ceylon Football Association, later rechristened as Football Federation of Sri Lanka in 1972. FSL affiliated with FIFA in 1952. FSL affiliated with Asian Football Confederation in 1954 & FFSL was founding member of South Asian Football Federation which was founded in 1997. In 2021 organisation has changed their name to the current one.

2023: FIFA suspension
FIFA suspended of the FFSL from 21 January 2023 until further notice. Therefore, all teams/clubs affiliated with the FFSL are no longer entitled to take part in international competitions.

National teams

Men
 Sri Lanka national football team
 Sri Lanka national under-23 football team
 Sri Lanka national under-20 football team
 Sri Lanka national under-17 football team
 Sri Lanka national beach soccer team

Women
 Sri Lanka women's national football team
 Sri Lanka women's national under-20 football team
 Sri Lanka women's national under-17 football team

Corporate structure

See also
 Football in Sri Lanka

References

External links
 Official website
 Sri Lanka at the FIFA website.
 Sri Lanka at AFC site

Football in Sri Lanka
1939 establishments in Ceylon
Sri Lanka
Sports governing bodies in Sri Lanka
Sports organizations established in 1939